Paul Avila Mayer (May 28, 1928 – July 10, 2009) was an American television writer and producer.

Personal life 
Mayer was born May 28, 1928 in Los Angeles, the son of Edwin Justus Mayer and Frances O'Neill. He was married to actress and comedian Sasha Von Scherler, the daughter of Stephen and Ruth Litscher, who died in 2000 of lung disease. They had three children together, daughters Rachael, Ruth, and Daisy.

Positions held
 Executive produce on Ryan's Hope (1975–1981)
 Co-head writer on Where the Heart Is (1971–1973), Love of Life (1973–1975), Ryan's Hope (1975–82, 1983), Search for Tomorrow (1985)
 Writer on Where the Heart Is (1970–1971) 
 Adaptation on Six Characters in Search of an Author (1976)

Awards and nominations
Mayer was nominated for ten Daytime Emmy Awards in the categories Outstanding Writing for a Drama Series and Outstanding Daytime Drama Series, for his work on Ryan's Hope. He was nominated annually except for 1982, from 1977 to 1984, and won eight times in 1977, 1978, 1979, 1980, 1983, and 1984. His first win was shared with Claire Labine and Mary Ryan Munisteri, and his first nomination was shared with Labine and Robert Costello.

After Ryan's Hope
According to an interview with co-creator Claire Labine, after the show's cancellation in 1989, Paul went back to school at the age of 56. He earned a Master of Social Work degree and then studied at a psychoanalytic institute, launching a successful career as a psychoanalyst. Mayer died on July 10, 2009 of a brain tumor.

Career as head writer

References

External links
 
 
 Ryan's Bar Online

2009 deaths
American soap opera writers
American television producers
Emmy Award winners
Soap opera producers
1928 births
American male screenwriters
American male television writers
20th-century American male writers
20th-century American screenwriters